Thomas Banks was a professional rugby league footballer who played in the 1930s and 1940s. He played at club level for Castleford (Heritage № 150).

Playing career

County League appearances
Tom Banks played in Castleford's victory in the Yorkshire County League during the 1938–39 season.

References

External links
Search for "Banks" at rugbyleagueproject.org
Banks Memory Box Search at archive.castigersheritage.com

Castleford Tigers players
English rugby league players
Place of birth missing
Place of death missing
Year of birth missing
Year of death missing